A level spreader is an erosion control device designed to reduce water pollution by mitigating the impact of high-velocity stormwater surface runoff.  It is used both on construction sites and for permanent applications such as drainage for roads and highways. The device reduces the energy level in high-velocity flow by converting it into sheet flow, and disperses the discharged water so that it may be infiltrated into soil.
 

Level spreaders may be used in conjunction with runoff infiltration devices such as bioretention systems, infiltration basins and percolation trenches.

See also
impervious surface
low impact development
urban runoff

References 

Construction
Environmental soil science
Geotechnical structures
Water pollution